The Association of Independent Members is a political party in the Solomon Islands. 
At the last legislative elections, 5 December 2001, the party won 13 out of 50 seats.

References

Political parties in the Solomon Islands